Sports City in Port Said, is a multi-use sports complex in Al-Dawahy district, Port Said, Egypt, which opened in January 2018 with an area of 76,000 m2.

It includes an Olympic swimming pool, a training pool, an Indoor Hall, a hockey court, a hockey and football facility, a squash complex, 5 small football field, 2 tennis courts, 2 multi-purpose halls, A legal football field, a social building and a children's play area.

References

Port Said
Sport in Port Said
Sports venues in Egypt
Sports venues completed in 2018
2018 establishments in Egypt
21st-century architecture in Egypt